Little Harbour   is a community in the Canadian province of Nova Scotia, in  Richmond County on Cape Breton Island.

References
Little Harbour on Destination Nova Scotia

Communities in Richmond County, Nova Scotia
General Service Areas in Nova Scotia